The Diboll Unit (or Diboll Correctional Center) is a private state prison for men located in Diboll, Angelina County, Texas, which is operated by Management and Training Corporation under contract with the Texas Department of Criminal Justice.  

This facility was opened in June 1995, and a maximum capacity of 518 male inmates.  Diboll is adjacent to the Rufus H. Duncan Geriatric Facility at 1502 South First Street, owned and operated by the state.

Notable inmates
 George Floyd

References

Prisons in Texas
Buildings and structures in Angelina County, Texas
Management and Training Corporation
1995 establishments in Texas